The folklore of India encompasses the folklore of the nation of India and the Indian subcontinent. India is an ethnically and religiously diverse country. Given this diversity, it is difficult to generalize the vast folklore of India as a unit.

Although India is a Hindu-majority country, with more than three-fourths of the population identifying themselves as Hindus, there is no single, unified, and all-pervading concept of identity present in it. Various heterogeneous traditions, numerous regional cultures and different religions to grow and flourish here. Folk religion in Hinduism may explain the rationale behind local religious practices, and contain local myths that explain the customs or rituals. However, folklore goes beyond religious or supernatural beliefs and practices, and encompasses the entire body of social tradition whose chief vehicle of transmission is oral or outside institutional channels.

Folk art of India
 The folk and tribal arts of India speak volumes about the country's rich heritage. Art forms in India have been exquisite and explicit. Folk art forms include various schools of art like the Mughal School, Rajasthani School, Nakashi art School etc. Each school has its distinct style of colour combinations or figures and its features. Other popular folk art forms include Madhubani paintings from Bihar, Kangra painting from Himachal Pradesh and Warli painting from Maharashtra. Tanjore paintings from South India incorporate real gold into their paintings. Local fairs, festivals, deities and heroes (warriors) play a vital role in this art form. In history the arts were made by upper caste but now they are famous worldwide.

Some famous folk and tribal arts of India include:

 Tanjore painting
 Madhubani painting
 Nirmal paintings
 Warli folk painting
 Pattachitra painting
 Rajasthani miniature painting
 Kalamezhuthu

Folktales of India

India possesses a large body of heroic ballads and epic poetry preserved in oral tradition, both in Sanskrit and the various vernacular languages of India. One such oral epic, telling the story of Pabuji, has been collected by Dr. John Smith from Rajasthan; it is a long poem in the Rajasthani language, traditionally told by professional story tellers, known as Bhopas, who deliver it in front of a tapestry that depicts the characters of the story, and functions as a portable temple, accompanied by a ravanhattho fiddle. The title character was a historical figure, a Rajput prince, who has been deified in Rajasthan.  

Various performing arts such as Garba and Dandiya Raas of Gujarat, Sambalpuri dance of Odisha, the Chhau, Alkap and Gambhira of West Bengal, Bihu dance of Assam, Ghoomar dance of Rajasthan and Haryanvi, Bhangra and Gidda of Punjab, Dhangar of Goa, Panthi dance of Chhattisgarh, Kummi, and Karagattam of TamilNadu, Kolattam of Andhra Pradesh, Yakshagana of Karnataka, Thirayattam of Kerala and Chang Lo of Nagaland derive their elements from myriads of myths, folktales and seasonal changes.

The Ramayana and the Mahabharata are the two greatest and most widely read epics of India. Other noteworthy collections of Indian traditional stories include the Panchatantra, a collection of traditional narratives made by Vishnu Sarma in the second century BC. The  Hitopadesha of Narayana is a collection of anthropomorphic fabliaux, animal fables, in Sanskrit, compiled in the ninth century.

Indian folklorists during the last thirty years have substantially contributed to the study of folklore. Devendra Satyarthi, Krishna Dev Upadyhayaya, Prafulla Dutta Goswami, Kunja Bihari Dash, Ashutosh Bhatacharya and many more senior folklorists have contributed for the study of folklore. But it is during the 1970s that some folklorists studied in US universities and trained up themselves with the modern theories and methods of folklore research and set a new trend of folklore study in India. Especially, South Indian universities advocated for folklore as a discipline in the universities and hundreds of scholars trained up on folklore. A.K. Ramanujan was the noted folklorist to analyse folklore from Indian context.

Study of folklore was strengthened by two stremas (sicsic); one is Finnish folklorist Lauri Honko and another is Peter J. Claus of American folklore. These two folklorists conducted their field work on Epic of Siri and led the Indian folklorists to the new folklore study. The Central Institute of Indian Languages has played a major role in promoting folklore studies in India to explore another reality of Indian culture.

Recently scholars such as Chitrasen Pasayat, M. D. Muthukumaraswamy, Vivek Rai, Jawaharlal Handoo, Birendranath Dutta, P. C. Pattanaik, B. Reddy, Sadhana Naithani, P. Subachary, Molly Kaushal, Shyam Sundar Mahapatra, Bhabagrahi Mishra and many new folklorists have contributed in their respective field for shaping folklore study as a strong discipline in representing the people's memory and people's voice. Recently the National Folklore Support Center in Chennai has taken the initiative to promote folklore in public domain and bridging the gap of academic domain and community domain.

Indian folk heroes, villains, and tricksters

Indian folk heroes like Rama, Krishna in Sanskrit epics and history and also in freedom movement are well known to every one. They have found a place in written literature. But in Indian cultural sub-system, Indian folk heroes are most popular. The castes and tribes of India have maintained their diversities of culture through their language and religion and customs. So in addition to national heroes, regional heroes and local folk and tribal heroes are alive in the collective memory of the people. Let's take examples of the Santhals or the Gonds. The Santhals have their culture heroes Beer Kherwal and Bidu Chandan. Gonds have their folk hero Chital Singh Chhatti. Banjara folk hero is Lakha Banjara or Raja Isalu.

But not only heroes, the heroines of Indian folklore have also significant contribution in shaping the culture of India. Banjara epics are heroine-centric.  These epics reflect the "sati" cult.

Oral epics with heroic actions of heroes and heroines produce a "counter text", as opposed to the written texts. Therefore, the younger brother becomes hero and kill his elder brother in an oral epic, which is forbidden in classical epics. Folk heroes are some times deified and are worshipped in the village. There is a thin difference of a mythic hero and romantic hero in Indian folklore. In Kalahandi, oral epics are available among the ethnic singers, performed in ritual context and social context. Dr Mahendra Mishra, a folklorist, has conducted research on oral epics in Kalahandi, taking seven ethnic groups. Dr. Chitrasen Pasayat has made an extensive study of different folk and tribal forms of Yatra, like Dhanu yatra, Kandhen-budhi yatra, Chuda-khai yatra, Sulia yatra, Patkhanda yatra, Budha-dangar yatra, Khandabasa yatra, Chhatar yatra, Sital-sasthi yatra and examined the 'hero characters' of the local deities.

Indian oral epics are found abundantly everywhere there are caste based culture. Prof. Lauri Honko from Turku, Finland with Prof. Vivek Rai and Dr K Chinnapa Gawda have conducted extensive field work and research on Siri Epic and have come out with three volumes on Epic of Siri, not Siri. Similarly Prof. Peter J Claus has done intensive work on Tulu epics. Aditya Mallick on Devnarayan epic, Pulikonda Subbachary on Jambupurana, Dr JD Smith on Pabuji epic are some of the commendable work that have been drawn attention of the wider readership.

Cultural archetypes and icons

 Ahimsa
 Amul girl
 Babu
 Bhajan
 Bhakti
 Curry
 Dharma
 Gandhian
 Ganges
 Gurukula
 Guru
 Street Cricket
 Hindu undivided family
 Karma
 Mahout
 Masala (film genre)
 Mega Serial
 Puja
 Puja (Hinduism)
 Sadhu
 Snake charmer
 Taj Mahal
 Yoga
 Yakshi

Traditional games of India

India has a long history of board games. You hear about these from the times of the Mahabharata and the Mughal empire. Some of the popular board games that originated from Indian Traditional games include Chess (Chaturanga), Ludo (Pachisi) and Snakes and Ladders (Moksha-Patamu).

Recently, Odisha, a state in eastern India, introduced a child-friendly programme called Srujan (creativity) in the primary schools. About 18 million children took part in four activities like story telling activities, traditional games, traditional art and craft and music and dance and riddles over a period of three years (2007–2010). The result is that while there are hundreds of varieties of folktales, the varieties of traditional games are limited. About three hundred traditional games both indoor and outdoor were commonly played and it was found that the traditional games contain mathematical knowledge (like counting, measurement, shapes and size, geometrical ideas and finally socialization through action). The traditional games are the best ways of teaching and learning. When these are applied in the primary schools, many teachers revealed that children know many games that the teachers have forgotten.

Indoor board game like "Kasadi" ( a wooden board with 14 pits played with tamarind seed by two or more than two girls in the domestic domain) was most popular and it is still not vanished from the society. Dr Mahendra Kumar Mishra, a folklorist and an educator has collected these games and has documented in video form.Besides other games in the domestic domain is the goat and the tiger and ganjifa. These were the forerunners of the card games of today. Ganjifa used to be circular painted stack of card like things which were played using certain rules.

Indian folklorists 
The scientific study of Indian folklore was slow to begin: early collectors felt far freer to creatively reinterpret source material and collected their material with a view to the picturesque rather than the representative.

A. K. Ramanujan's theoretical and aesthetic contributions span several disciplinary areas. Context-sensitivity is a theme that appears not only in Ramanujan's cultural essays, but also appears in his writing about Indian folklore and classic poetry. In "Where Mirrors are Windows," (1989) and in "Three Hundred Ramayanas" (1991), for example, he discusses the "intertextual" nature of Indian literature, written and oral...He says, "What is merely suggested in one poem may become central in a 'repetition' or an 'imitation' of it. His essay "Where Mirrors Are Windows: Toward an Anthology of Reflections" (1989), and his commentaries in The Interior Landscape: Love Poems from a Classical Tamil Anthology (1967) and Folktales from India, Oral Tales from Twenty Indian Languages (1991) are good examples of his work in Indian folklore studies.

Rudyard Kipling was interested in folklore, dealing with English folklore in works such as Puck of Pook's Hill and Rewards and Fairies; his experiences in India led him to also create similar works with Indian themes. Kipling spent a great deal of his life in India and was familiar with the Hindi language. His works such as the two Jungle Books contain a lot of stories that are written after the manner of traditional folktales. Indian themes also appear in his Just So Stories, and many of the characters bear recognisable names from Indian languages. During the same period, Helen Bannerman penned the now notorious Indian-themed tale of Little Black Sambo, which represented itself to be an Indian folktale.

After independence, disciplines and methods from anthropology began to be used in the creation of more in-depth surveys of Indian folklore.

Folklorists of India can be broadly divided into three phases. Phase I was the British Administrators who collected the local knowledge and folklore to understand the subjects they want to rule. next were the missionaries who wanted to acquire the language of the people to recreate their religious literature for evangelical purpose. The third phase was the post-independent period in the country where many universities, institutes and individuals started studying the folklore. the purpose was to search the national identity through legends, myths, and epics. In the course of time, Academic institutions and universities in the country started opening departments on folklore in their respective regions, more in south India to maintain their cultural identity and also maintain language and culture.

After independence, scholars like Dr Satyendra, Devendra Satyarthi, Krishnadev Upadhayaya, Jhaberchand Meghani, Prafulla Dutta Goswami, Ashutosh Bhattacharya, Kunja Bihari Dash, Chitrasen Pasayat, Somnath Dhar, Ramgarib Choubey, Jagadish Chandra Trigunayan and many more were the pioneer in working on folklore. Of course, the trend was more literary than analytical. It was during the 1980s that the central Institute of Indian Languages and the American Institute of Indian Studies started their systemic study on Folklore any after that many western, as well as eastern scholars, pursued their studies on folklore as a discipline.

The pioneer of the folklorists in contemporary India is Jawaharlal Handoo, Sadhana Naithani, Kishore Bhattacharjee, Kailash Patnaik, VA Vivek Rai, late Komal Kothari, Raghavan Payanad, M Ramakrishnan, Nandini Sahu and many more.  An emerging trend of new folklorists has emerged who are committed to understanding folklore from an Indian point of view than to see the whole subjects from the western model. Some of them are better to prefer to understand folklore from the folklore provider and consultants who are the creator and consumers of folklore. The user of folklore knows what folklore is since their use folklore with purpose and meaning.  But theoreticians see folklore from their theoretical angle. Ethics point of view, folklorist should learn from the folk as practicable as possible and folk should give the hidden meaning of folklore to the folklorist so that both of their interpretation can help to give a new meaning to the item of folklore and explore the possibility of use of folklore in the new socio-cultural domain.

Dr Mahendra Kumar Mishra from Kalahandi, Odisha has substantially contributed to the tribal folklore of Middle Indian and Odisha. His seminal book Oral Epics of Kalahandi has been translated into Chinese, and Finnish language.  He has written Saora folk literature, Paharia Folkliterature,  Visioning Folklore, Oral Poetry of Kalahandi.  His recent seminal work is three oral Ramakatha in tribal oral tradition.  Dr Mishra has written five books on folklore theory and research methodology adopting the folklore of western Odisha and Chhattisgarh.  The analytical work of Dr Mishra has been widely studied in the western and eastern world as a part of South Asian folklore.

Now the National Folklore Support Center, Chennai since the last ten years has created a space for the new scholars who are pursuing the study of folklore with their commitment. One important breakthrough in the field of folklore is that it is no more confined to the study in the four walls of academic domain, rather, it has again found its space within and among the folk to get their true meaning.

Dr.Raghavanvpayyanad is a major role in Indian folklore study he has written so many books about folklore, he is also an international face of Indian folkloristics both in English and Malayalam.

Folk songs and folk music
India has a rich and varied tradition of folk music and numerous types of folk songs. Some traditional folk song genres have been recognized as Intangible Cultural Heritage listed by UNESCO. Among these traditions, a well-known musical and religious repertoire is known as Baul, which has become famous in the World Music scene. Among the most respected historical figures of the Baul tradition, Lalon Fakir and Bhaba Pagla are often mentioned.

See also
 Culture of India
 Dance in India
 Indian art
 Indian cuisine
 Indian literature
 Music of India
 Tamasha
 Hindu deities
 Meitei deities
 Meitei mythology
 Hindu mythology, Vedic mythology, Proto-Indo-Iranian religion
 Hindu texts
 History of India
 Indian epic poetry
 List of Hindu deities
 Outline of Hinduism
 Ramayana, Mahabharata, the Puranas
 Khamba Thoibi Sheireng, Khamba and Thoibi
 Numit Kappa
 Thirayattam
 Women warriors in literature and culture
 Helloi
 Yakshagana

References

Bibliography

Further reading
On Indian folktales:
 Mishra, Mahendra Kumar Oral Epics of Kalahandi, 2007, National Folklore Support Center, Chennai
Thompson, Stith, and Roberts, Warren Everett. Types of Indic Oral Tales: India, Pakistan, And Ceylon. Helsinki: Suomalainen Tiedeakatemia, 1960.
Thompson, Stith, and Balys, Jonas. The Oral Tales of India. Bloomington: Indiana University Press, 1958.

External links
 National Folklore Support Centre, Official website

India
Folklore by region